Tragoudia Gia Tous Mines (Songs For The Months) is an album by popular Greek artist Eleftheria Arvanitaki and it was released in 1996. It was written and arranged by Dimitris Papadimitriou and the lyrics are poems by Sappho, Maria Polydouri, Kostas Karyotakis, Odysseas Elytis and Michalis Ganas, as well as traditional couplets.  It sold over 60,000 copies in Greece and was certified Platinum. The vinyl collector's edition release of the album was in the form of a small record player. The CD album's package and the disk itself featured extensive artwork following mostly a theme on the sky and the constellations.

Track listing 
 "Proti Isimeria" - First Equinox -  - Orchestral; Thymios Papadopoulos in solo flute
 "Sappho" - Sappho -  - Rendition of a Sappho's poem by Sotiris Kakisis
 "Taximi" - Taqsim -  - Achilleas Persides in solo laouto
 "Lianotragoudo" - Demotic distich song -  - Lyrics by  Michalis Ganas
 "Sou To' Pa Gia Ta Syneffa" - I told you about the clouds -  - Poem by Elytis
 "Den Tragoudo Para Giati M' Agapises" - I only sing because you loved me -  -  Poem by Polydouri
 "To Parapono"- The Plaint -  -  Poem by Elytis; also singing: Giorgos Makras
 "Pame Ksana Sta Thavmata" - Let's go again to the miracles -  - Lyrics by Ganas
 "O Agamemnon" - Agamemnon -  - Poem by Elytis; also singing: Makras
 "Defteri Isimeria" - Second Equinox -  - Orchestral 
 "Ola Ta Pire To Kalokairi" - Summer has taken everything -  - Poem by Elytis
 "Se Palaio Symfoititi" - To an old fellow student -  - Poem by Karyotakis
 "Mavra Pionia" - Black Pawns -  - Lyrics by Ganas
 "Tou Pothou To Agrimi" - Lust's wild beast -  - Lyrics by Ganas
 "San Tin Agapi Tin Krifi" - Like the hidden love -  - Demotic distichs

References

External links
Album at artist's official webpage

1996 albums
Eleftheria Arvanitaki albums
Greek-language albums
Universal Music Greece albums